Furanylnorfentanyl is an inactive synthetic  opioid analgesic drug precursor.  It is an analog of fentanyl.

See also
 3-Methylbutyrfentanyl
 4-Fluorobutyrfentanyl
 4-Fluorofentanyl
 α-Methylfentanyl
 Acetylfentanyl
 Benzylfentanyl
 Furanylfentanyl
 Homofentanyl
 List of fentanyl analogues

References

Further reading 

 
 
 
 
 

General anesthetics
Synthetic opioids
4-Piperidinyl compounds
Anilides
Mu-opioid receptor agonists
2-Furyl compounds